Herman Perry (May 16, 1922 – March 15, 1945) was an African-American soldier serving in the U.S. Army during World War II, who deserted after killing an unarmed, white lieutenant attempting to arrest him. After being sentenced to death, he escaped custody, and a manhunt was launched while he lived in the jungle. Perry was eventually recaptured once more and court-martialed. He was hanged for murder and desertion, making him the only American executed in the China Burma India Theater during World War II.

Biography
He was born on May 16, 1922, in the rural outskirts of Monroe, North Carolina . His mother, teenager Flonnie Perry, and father Prouda Salsbrook were unmarried. Salsbrook left when Herman was young. Herman moved with his mother to Washington, D.C., and got a job as a butcher's apprentice.

Following America's entry into the Second World War in December 1941, Perry was enlisted. He did not attend his first draft board appointment and was arrested for non-compliance. As a soldier in the army's 849th Engineer (Aviation) Battalion he served in the China-Burma-India Theater, helping to construct the Ledo Road.

On March 3, 1944, Perry's CO, Lt. Harold Cady, attempted to apprehend him for dereliction of duty and place him in the area's military prison. Perry had previously served time in this prison and was well aware of the abuses that went on there. When he was found he was holding a rifle and repeatedly warned Cady not to approach him and to "Get back."

Cady continued to advance and Perry fired his rifle, shooting Cady in the stomach, a wound which was fatal. Perry fled into the wilderness and lived out a fugitive's life of jungle survival, happenstance finding a morung; a bamboo structure on stilts built over a pig sty, which served as a bachelors' quarter for a tribe of the Naga people of northeastern India and northern Burma.

It is unknown exactly how Perry managed to win the tribe over, but his familiarity with their language undoubtedly helped and he also offered them rations which he had taken from the military store.

After adapting to the headhunting lifestyle of the tribe which the Ang, or village chief, told him was called Tgum Ga by the Burmese, he eventually won the Ang's respect and approval to the extent that he even married the Ang's 14-year-old daughter whom later conceived his child.

A tribesman was sent to a nearby bazaar to help Perry obtain cigarettes only available at the black market. While there he told others of a black American soldier living with his tribe. Word quickly spread and reached the local authorities, the British and finally the U.S. Army. A Naga scout was sent to the village of Tgum Ga and returned to confirm the story. And upon being shown the photo, he confirmed the black American soldier to be Herman Perry.

On July 20, 1944, after the scout confirmed Perry was still at Tgum Gam at night, the officers of the 502nd Military Police Battalion were sent to arrest Perry. Perry was inside a basha and was alerted to their presence, he immediately fled into the jungle. Several shots were fired with one hitting Perry in the chest. Perry was later captured and was brought out of the jungle to a nearby evacuation hospital.

Despite his serious injury he survived, and as Perry's condition improved he was moved to the 20th General Hospital. While at the hospital and under the influence of morphine and other pain killers, he was questioned by the Criminal Investigation Division. His answers amounted to a confession, which he was forced to sign and eventually sealed his fate.

The court-martial took place at a tea plantation in Ledo on September 4, 1944, which took six and a half hours. In addition to murder, Perry was also charged with desertion and several counts of willful disobedience. Perry was sentenced to be dishonorably discharged, forfeit all pay and allowances, and to be hanged.

While pending execution at Ledo Stockade with formalities being dragged on for three months, Perry studied the guard's routines and was able to obtain a pair of wire cutters from a sympathetic visitor. After midnight on December 16, 1944, he cut his way through the wire fence and escaped. Following his escape, wanted posters of Herman Perry went up along the roads and fliers in Kachin and Burmese languages were distributed to native people and air-dropped over remote villages.

Perry found his way to an abandoned timber camp, about five miles from Ledo, however he was spotted again and his whereabouts soon reached the MPs back in Ledo. On the New Year Day 1945, the MPs reached the timber camp, shots were fired with one grazed Perry's ankle. But Perry managed to escape.

In February 1945, General Joe Cranston appointed Major Earl Owen Cullum, a former Dallas police officer and the commander of the 159th Military Police Battalion in the China Burma India Theater, to lead the manhunt. Perry was nearly caught twice by Cullum's team but escaped both times. He also suffered more serious wounds along the way.

Perry was finally captured in Assam on March 9, 1945, and was placed under heavy guard at 234th General Hospital. A few hours later he was taken to Chabua Stockade, Chabua and there he was confined in an isolation cell. On March 15, 1945, he was taken back to Ledo Stockade where his death sentence by hanging was carried out.

Perry's body was placed in a coffin and taken to the Army cemetery at Margherita and buried in a grave with a white cross behind a hedge, about one hundred yards from all other soldier's graves. His mother received the letter of his death two days later.

His story was initially covered up by Army leadership, but would soon-after revealed by the same leader of the manhunt in his later years, Lt. Col. Earl Owen Cullum.

His young Naga wife had since gave birth, this was confirmed by a team who were searching for a downed plane in August 1945, who along the way reported encountering a young Naga woman with a curly-haired, dark-skinned infant along with cases of Army rations stored in a basha plastered with the wanted fliers of Perry previously air-dropped by the Army.

In 1949 the remains of soldiers who died in CBI were repatriated to the U.S. with Perry's remains being sent to the post cemetery at the Schofield Barracks in Hawaii, where he was buried in an area reserved for executed soldiers who had been executed by the Army.

In 1990, Cullum would further publicize his first-hand accounts of the chase in his personally-published book, "Manhunt in Burma and Assam: World War II in the China-Burma-India Theater". Prior to his death at the 2003 at the age of 89, Cullum received a letter from Perry's half-brother Hank Johnson, and both engaged in a brief correspondence.

In 2007, Edna Wilson, Perry's last surviving sibling, having heard that her late brother was buried in Hawaii, asked the writer Brendan I. Koerner for help to locate and bring him back. With her own money, Wilson arranged to have her brother's body dug up and cremated. His remains eventually returned to her via mail and buried with his family members at a cemetery in Washington, D.C.

The Herman Perry story would later be republicized by Koerner in 2008 as Now the Hell Will Start: One Soldier's Flight From the Greatest Manhunt of World War II; George Pelecanos called it "A fascinating, untold story of the Second World War, an incendiary social document, and a thrilling, campfire tale adventure." Other major news outlets would later pick up the story as a greater, complex reflection of race relations between African Americans and commanding white officers in the military, especially during the Jim Crow era.

See also
 Capital punishment by the United States military
 Capital punishment in the United States
 List of people executed by the United States military

References

External links
 Kenneth H. Cullum, "The Herman Perry Saga", 2008, Dallas County Pioneers Association. 
 Wil Haygood, "The Jungle of a Life", The Washington Post, June 4, 2008.

1922 births
1945 deaths
Executed people from North Carolina
People from Monroe, North Carolina
20th-century executions of American people
20th-century executions by the United States military
People executed by the United States military by hanging
African Americans in World War II
Executed African-American people
United States Army soldiers
United States Army personnel of World War II
United States Army personnel who were court-martialed
American people executed for murder
African-American United States Army personnel
People convicted of murder by the United States military
Deserters